Gino Boccasile (14 July 1901 – 10 May 1952) was an Italian illustrator.

Born in Bari, Boccasile was the son of a perfumer. Early in his youth, he lost his left eye by having it struck by a splash of quicklime while he was drinking from a fountain. Nonetheless, he showed a precocious aptitude for design and completed studies at the fine art school of his home town.

After the death of his father in 1925, he moved to Milan. Despite some initial difficulties, he eventually gained a post at the Mauzan-Morzenti Agency. Over the next few years he produced posters, illustrated fashion magazines and gained fame for his sensuous renderings of the female form.

Following the lead of fellow poster artist Achille Mauzan, Boccasile went to Buenos Aires, where he met his future spouse Alma Corsi. In 1932, he moved to Paris, where an issue of “Paris Tabou” was dedicated to his work. He also participated in the Salon des Indépendants, that same year. Shortly after returning to Milan, he opened a publicity agency called ACTA, in Galleria del Corso, with his friend Franco Aloi. He illustrated for the Italian periodicals "La Donna" (1932), "Dea" and "La Lettura" (1934), "Bertoldo" (1936), "Il Milione" (1938), "L'Illustrazione del Medico" (1939), "Ecco", "Settebello" and "Il Dramma" (1939) and designed many book covers for publishers Mondadori and Rizzoli'.

A supporter of Benito Mussolini, Boccasile produced propaganda material for his government. As the tide of war turned against Fascism he became more involved in it, becoming a supporter of the German puppet state, RSI, established by Mussolini in Northern and Central Italy after his liberation from the Gran Sasso exile. Boccasile enlisted in the Italian SS Division, drawing their recruitment posters and illustrating propaganda material.
After the signing of the Tripartite Pact, (an agreement concluded by Germany, Italy, and Japan on September 27, 1940, one year after the start of World War II) propaganda in the Axis powers started to spread everywhere. This created a defense alliance between the countries and largely intended to deter the United States from entering the conflict. 
One of these famous propaganda was created by an Italian Illustrator called Gino Boccasile, a supporter of Benito Mussolini who produced propaganda material for his government. The poster presents a giant Samurai holding a sword and the Axis powers, sinking the naval boats in the US. This tripartite pact propaganda was intended to create a strong feeling of union, power, alliance between the Germans, Italians and Japanese military forces (all as one single force), and minimize the US military strength to encourage the countries after the Pearl Harbor attack, a devastating surprise attack by Japanese forces on December 7, 1941, in which the Japanese 
After this, on December 8 the United States declared war on Japan, and four days later Germany and Italy declared war on the United States. 

After the war, he was imprisoned and tried for collaborating with the fascists. Though acquitted, he remained an outcast. He could not find work for several years, as his notoriety was feared by prospective employers.

He supported himself briefly by doing pornographic sketches for English and French publishers, and by 1946, after changing his style, Boccasile was back at work. He set up his own agency in Milan where he created memorable posters for Paglieri cosmetics, Chlorodont toothpaste, Iperchina liquors and Zenith footwear.

He died in Milan, from bronchitis and pleurisy, in 1952.

References

1901 births
1952 deaths
People from Bari
Italian illustrators
Italian poster artists
Italian erotic artists
People of the Italian Social Republic
SS officers
Italian Waffen-SS personnel
Nazi propagandists
Deaths from bronchitis